is a free-to-play tactical role-playing game developed by Intelligent Systems and published by Nintendo for Android and iOS. The game is a mobile spin-off of the Fire Emblem series featuring its characters, and was released on February 2, 2017. Fire Emblem Heroes received a number of awards and nominations in "Best Mobile Game" categories.  the game had grossed over  worldwide, making it Nintendo's highest-grossing mobile game.

Gameplay 

Fire Emblem Heroes is a tactical role-playing game.  Players control a team of up to four characters ("Heroes") against enemy teams of varying sizes on an 8x6 grid map.  Different characters have different movement restrictions; for example, armored units have a shorter range than cavalry units, but cavalry units cannot enter forest tiles.  Flying units can enter most tiles, even ones impassable to all other units such as water or mountains.  The game strictly alternates between a player phase and an enemy phase every turn.  During the player's phase, Heroes can attack enemy characters when in range; if both the attacker and defender have the same range, the defender will counterattack if still alive.  Heroes deal either physical or magical damage types; they also have a "color" that informs a rock paper scissors-esque system that makes it so some units have advantageous match-ups over other units.  After moving and optionally attacking with all their heroes, the enemy phase occurs where the game's AI does the same for the opposing team of characters.  The player, in general, seeks to lure enemy units into disadvantageous match-ups by careful character positioning on the map.  Unlike other Fire Emblem titles, there is no element of randomness or chance in battles; an engagement between two characters is perfectly deterministic, as is the enemy AI, so a given strategy will either win or lose consistently.  Fire Emblem Heroes has a set of "story" missions divided by chapters for the player to complete, rotating challenge missions, a training tower for increasing character's strength in random battles, fights against other players' teams (albeit controlled by the game's AI) in the "Arena" and in "Aether Raids", special challenges involving "Brigades" where teams with eight or more characters are controlled on a larger map than usual, and a variety of other content to complete.

The game's currency is known as "orbs", which can be used to acquire new heroes as well as several other quality-of-life items. Missions cost stamina to play while stamina is recovered over time; the exact cost of missions and maximum of stamina held has varied over the course of the app.  Orbs are either earned by completing in-game activities or with in-app purchases.

Upon its initial release date, Fire Emblem Heroes players could potentially access up to 100 distinct controllable units in the game, with players beginning with access to Alfonse, Sharena, and Anna.  These three members of the "Order of Heroes" were created specifically for Heroes,  with the remainder of the controllable characters being crossovers from the rest of the franchise.  Since release, additional characters have been added to the list, including from games that were previously not featured.  In general, most characters are gained via a "Summon" tab which works on a gacha system.  Orbs are spent on randomized heroes, with some heroes being common and other heroes being rare.  Other heroes are gained for free, by completing in-game missions of varying difficulty and effort.  If a player gains duplicates of the same character, the duplicates can be merged to create a single more powerful character.

In March 2017, the game added "skill inheritance", which allows characters to mix skills previously reserved to other heroes: for example, a hero could gain another character's weapon or special ability.  In November 2017, the game released "Book II", which included a new animated video, new story missions, added new mechanics, increased the power of some of the weapons and skills perceived as weak, and introduced a new set of Heroes-exclusive allies and villains.  Heroes has continued to release new content and new characters.  By December 2017, the game included more than 200 unique heroes; in August 2021, the game has more than 600 characters.

Plot 
The main conflict in Fire Emblem Heroes is a war between the nations of Askr and Embla. The protagonist, also known as the summoner, whose name can be chosen by the player, aids the Kingdom of Askr and its Order of Heroes, whose members include its Commander Anna, Prince Alfonse, and Princess Sharena. Embla is led by Princess Veronica and Prince Bruno; Veronica is featured on the original app icon and prominently in the title artwork. Both sides use summoned heroes from other worlds, with the other worlds being the settings of other Fire Emblem games. In the Book II expansion, released from November 2017–September 2018, two new nations are introduced: the Kingdom of Nifl and its Princess Fjorm, who ally with Askr, and the Kingdom of Múspell and its King Surtr, Princess Laevatein, and strategist Loki, who ally with Embla. In the Book III expansion, released from December 2018–November 2019, both Askr and Embla come under invasion from the forces of Hel, the realm of the dead. The protagonist gains an ally in Eir, who is Hel's daughter. In Book IV, Askr faces the forces of Dökkálfheimr, a realm inhabited by evil fairy-like creatures of nightmares. In Book V, Askr battles the forces of Niðavellir, a country whose inhabitants have merged magic and technology. In Book VI, the previously defused conflict between Askr and Embla is reignited by Embla's eponymous patron deity.

The setting of Heroes includes loose references to Norse mythology; the names of the warring countries are that of Ask and Embla, the first humans, while the kingdoms introduced in later books match that of Niflheim, Muspelheim, and Hel. Place names and spell descriptions often include fragments in the Old Norse language, such as rauðr, blár, and gronn for red, blue, and green. The members of Múspell have the names of Surtr, the fire giant; Loki the trickster half-giant / half-god; and Laevatein the weapon; the members of Hel include references to Hel (the deity), Líf, and Eir.

Development 
The game was announced by Nintendo as the third mobile game made under the DeNA partnership in April 2016, alongside an Animal Crossing mobile game, and was originally set for release that year.  Intelligent Systems, the studio within Nintendo that has produced the other games of the Fire Emblem series, headed up development of Heroes to ensure it would be a proper Fire Emblem game optimized for mobile devices.  The game's title and gameplay details were later revealed during a Fire Emblem Direct presentation in January 2017. Immediately afterwards, Nintendo launched an online "choose your legend" promotion, in which players could vote for various characters from the series to be included in the game. The game was initially released in 39 countries for Android and iOS devices on February 2, 2017. As was the case with Nintendo's previously released mobile game Super Mario Run, Fire Emblem Heroes requires players to have an internet connection to play.

Since release, the game has continued releasing new characters and features.  Shingo Matsushita, the director of Heroes, compared a normal Fire Emblem game to a movie, and Heroes to a television series; there would be a constant demand for new "episodes", but there would also be a feedback loop between the producers and the players that could affect the initial vision of the product.

Reception 

At time of release, Fire Emblem Heroes received mixed reception, according to review aggregator Metacritic. One critic praised the game's casual-friendly design with its straightforward combat and character collection, but did not like the arbitrary play time constraint that stamina limit creates. Criticism of the stamina restrictions at launch were later met by an increase in the Stamina cap as well as a reduction in the Stamina spent to complete missions.

During the first day of release, Nintendo reported that the game generated more than $2.9 million. The game also ranked in third place in Japan when the game launched, also making shares skyrocket for the company. By December 2017, the game had grossed  from 12million paid players. By September 2018, the game had reached 14.1million downloads and grossed . By February 2019, the game had grossed  worldwide, with Japan accounting for 56% (about ) of its revenue. , the game has grossed  worldwide, making it Nintendo's highest-grossing mobile game.

Commentators have noted that despite having an install base smaller than Super Mario Run, Fire Emblem Heroes is more financially lucrative for Nintendo. The Verge noted this was due both to being a "superior game" to Super Mario Run as well as Heroes targeting a somewhat older audience willing and capable of paying microtransactions for more content.

The game won the award for "Best Game of 2017" in Google Play Japan, and for "Best Mobile Game" in Destructoids Game of the Year Awards 2017, and it also won the People's Choice Award for the same category in IGNs Best of 2017 Awards. Polygon ranked it 20th on their list of the 50 best games of 2017.

Accolades

Notes

References

External links 
 

2017 video games
Android (operating system) games
Crossover role-playing video games
IOS games
Intelligent Systems games
Heroes
Free-to-play video games
Tactical role-playing video games
Single-player video games
Gacha games
Video games developed in Japan